Omorgus loxus is a beetle of the family Trogidae.

References 

loxus
Beetles described in 1955